Sky Greenland (formerly known as Greenland Express)  was a virtual airline headquartered in Kangerlussuaq, Greenland, which started operations in June 2014, using a sole Fokker 100 leased from Denim Air ACMI.

History
Sky Greenland started operations on 17 June 2014 with two Fokker 100 aircraft (one in storage for possible new routes coming soon, and used for charter services), mainly flying between Greenland and Denmark, Kangerlussuaq - Narsarsuaq - Keflavik - Aalborg - Copenhagen. It had plans to operate from Akureyri in Iceland to other destinations in Europe. (direct flights from Akureyri save at least 4 hours travel time compared to changes at Reykjavík, partly because of the ground transfer needed). It also had plans to have a hub in Greenland in the future.

In early 2015, it was announced that the airline was expecting to finalize a three-year wet lease agreement for two Airbus A319 aircraft. In , the carrier was granted permission to fly domestic services, which were expected to commence before .

Plans to restart regular services in July and then August 2015 were abandoned.

Destinations
Sky Greenland had plans to operate from Billund Airport and Copenhagen Airport to Kangerlussuaq Airport and Narsarsuaq Airport, but the airline was not able to launch operations in 2015. The airline was going to lease an Airbus A319-100 from BH Air, but problems with payment resulted with the contract not being completed.

Fleet

References

External links

Companies based in Aalborg
Companies based in Reykjavík
2013 establishments in Denmark
Greenlandic companies established in 2013
Defunct airlines of Greenland